The Ebb and Flow is an American indie pop band formed in 2001.

The band's sound is considered experimental pop/rock with influences from 1970s progressive rock. In the summer of 2005, they had a national tour in support of their first album Time to Echolocate, which culminated in a performance at the CMJ music marathon in New York City and the Northwest Music Fest in Portland, OR.

The band recorded its second full-length album in March 2006 with engineer Aaron Prellwitz (Neil Young, Sun Kil Moon) and producer Christian Hanlon (Unbunny, the Ebb and Flow)

In prelude to their 2nd North American tour the band released a "tour only" EP titled Here Are Caught the Ebb and Flow.

In October 2007, the band released its final recording "Attack and Decay" (Huevo Imaginary Records) at their farewell show at Great American Music Hall in San Francisco.

Members
Roshy Kheshti - keyboards, vocals
Sam Tsitrin - guitar, bass, vocals
Sara Cassetti - percussion

Discography

Murmurs (2003, EP)
Time to Echolocate (2005, Three Ring Records, LP)
Here Are Caught the Ebb and Flow (2006, EP)
"Attack and Decay" (2008, Huevo Imaginary Records, LP)

External links
Official site 
Podcast Interview with the Ebb and Flow*
We Is Shore Dedicated - a project by the guitarist Sam Tsitrin*

Indie rock musical groups from California
Musical groups established in 2001
Indie pop groups from California